Josée Piché (born July 19, 1974) is a Canadian former ice dancer. She was born in Montreal and competed with partner Pascal Denis for 17 years, winning a bronze medal at the 2000 Canadian Figure Skating Championships and finishing 23rd at the 2004 World Figure Skating Championships, their final competition together.

Programs 
(with Denis)

Results
GP: Grand Prix

with Denis

References

External links

1974 births
Canadian female ice dancers
Living people
Figure skaters from Montreal